Ruslan Tien Kuang (born 25 October 1985) is a Bulgarian professional footballer of Vietnamese descent currently playing for Bdin Vidin. He plays as a defender.

Career
In February 2013, it was revealed that Kuang may be called up to represent the Vietnam national side, the country of his father, but this eventually did not materialize.

References

1985 births
Living people
Bulgarian footballers
FC Botev Vratsa players
PFC Lokomotiv Plovdiv players
Bulgarian people of Vietnamese descent
First Professional Football League (Bulgaria) players
People from Vidin
Sportspeople of Vietnamese descent
Association football defenders